Maria Domenica Lazzeri (1815–1848) also known as la Meneghina was an Italian mystic. The cause for her beatification was started in 1943.

Life
Maria Domenica Lazzeri was born on May 16, 1815, in Capriana, Italy.
She is known as “l'addolorata di Capriana” (“The sorrowful woman of Capriana”). After her father's death in 1829, her health began to deteriorate, and as of 1833 she became bedridden. According to her physician, she ate and drank nothing for the last 14 years of her life except for receiving Holy Communion. In 1835 she received the stigmata, and shortly after, the crown of thorns. She is frequently depicted with her hands joined together bleeding as she lays upon her bed. She died on the 4th of April, 1848. Her cause for canonization was formally reopened in 1995, and she is currently styled Servant of God.

See also
 Alexandrina of Balazar
 Anne Catherine Emmerich
 Marie Rose Ferron
 Marthe Robin

References

Sources
 Guido Sommavilla Maria Domenica Lazzeri San Paolo Press 1996 
 mystics of the church

External links

 Capriana website
 Hagiography Circle

Italian Servants of God
Stigmatics
19th-century Christian mystics
Roman Catholic mystics
1848 deaths
1815 births
People from Trentino
Women mystics